The Ravan is a river in Leningrad Oblast in Russia, a right tributary of the Tigoda. It starts from the Otlizino lake.

References

Rivers of Leningrad Oblast